is a Prefectural Natural Park in western Miyagi Prefecture, Japan. First designated for protection in 1947, the park is within the municipality of Sendai. Wildlife in the park includes the Japanese macaque and Japanese serow.

See also
 National Parks of Japan

References

External links
  Maps of Futakuchi Kyōkoku Prefectural Natural Park (16 & 22)

Parks and gardens in Miyagi Prefecture
Protected areas established in 1947
1947 establishments in Japan
Sendai